Parthenon is an unincorporated community in Newton County, Arkansas, United States. Parthenon has a post office with ZIP code 72666.

An EF2 tornado destroyed the city's post office and damaged nearby structures on March 7, 2017.

External links
 Newton County Historical Society

References

Unincorporated communities in Newton County, Arkansas
Unincorporated communities in Arkansas